Show Me may refer to:

Music
 Show Me (54-40 album), a 1987 album by 54-40, or the title song
 Show Me (The Cover Girls album)
 "Show Me" (The Cover Girls song), the title song from the album, also covered by former lead singer Angel Clivillés
 "Show Me" (Jessica Sutta song)
 "Show Me" (John Legend song)
 "Show Me" (Joe Tex song)
 Show Me, a 1966 album by Joe Tex
 "Show Me" (Moya Brennan song)
 "Show Me" (Kid Ink song)
 "Show Me", a song by ABC from The Lexicon of Love
 "Show Me", a song by Big Time Rush from Elevate
 "Show Me", a song by Bruno Mars from Unorthodox Jukebox
 "Show Me", a song by Dexys Midnight Runners
 "Show Me", a song by Janet Jackson from 20 Y.O.
 "Show Me", a song by Michael Lington
 "Show Me", a song by Mint Royale from Dancehall Places
 "Show Me", a song by Over the Rhine from Ohio
 "Show Me" (Pretenders song)
 "Show Me", a song by Sandie Shaw
 "Show Me", a song by Ultra Naté from One Woman's Insanity
 "Show Me", a song by Yes from The Ultimate Yes: 35th Anniversary Collection
 "Show Me", a song from the 1956 stage musical My Fair Lady
 "Show Me", a song by Gabrielle from Under My Skin

Other uses
 Show Me!, a 1975 English version of the 1974 German sex-education book Zeig Mal!
 Show Me (film), a 2004 Canadian film
 Show Me (TV series), a 1987 British TV game show hosted by Joe Brown
 "Show Me", the unofficial motto of the U.S. state of Missouri

See also
 Show Me Show Me, a UK children's TV show
 Show Me the Money (disambiguation)